The Guyana cricket team represents, originally, the British colony of British Guiana and later the independent state of Guyana.

Guyana's inaugural first-class match (as British Guiana) commenced on 29 August 1895 against Trinidad at Bourda in Georgetown, Guyana, its first List A limited overs match occurred on 13 April 1973 against Jamaica at Kensington Oval, Bridgetown, Barbados and its first Twenty20 match occurred on 21 July 2006 against Montserrat at Stanford Cricket Ground, Saint George Parish, Antigua and Barbuda.

While some of the cricketers listed below represented other teams the information included is solely for their career with Guyana, including as the Guyana Amazon Warriors.

Key
 First – Year of debut
 Last – Year of latest game
 Apps – Number of matches played
  – Player has represented West Indies in a Test match, Limited Overs International or Twenty20 International match.
  - Player has represented an international side other than the West Indies in a Test match, Limited Overs International or Twenty20 International.

Cricketers

Notes

References

Lists of Guyanese cricketers